Kandanga is a town and a locality in the Gympie Region, Queensland, Australia.

Geography 
This river forms the eastern and north-eastern boundaries of the locality.

Kandanga is one of a chain of towns in the Mary Valley also including Imbil, Amamoor and Dagun.

Kandanga suffered a further blow when its popular hotel burnt down. Just like the valley itself, it is being rebuilt with the determination of locals.

History
The name "Kandanga" may be derived from the local Kabi Aboriginal language, meaning a fork or sharp bend of the creek or it may refer to the cabbage tree.

Kandanga Post Office opened by June 1914 (a receiving office had been open from 1895).

Kandanga State School opened in September 1915.

The Kandanga War Memorial was unveiled on 11 November 1920 by the Member of the Queensland Legislative Assembly for the Cooroora Harry Walker.

In 2006, the Beattie state government announced plans to construct the Traveston Crossing Dam at Traveston Crossing on the upper Mary River. The proposed dam, designed to provide water to the growing Sunshine Coast, was to have flooded fertile farmland, including Kandanga. However, the dam did not proceed on environmental grounds, but not before much of the land required was bought up and the original owners moved on. A reconstruction plan was implemented following the decision to not build the dam, with farm land subdivided and offered to new owners who have introduced new crops to the Mary Valley.

On 12 December 2015, the 101-year-old Kandanga Hotel burned down following a fire which started in the kitchen. Local people rallied to establish a temporary hotel next door until the hotel could be rebuilt. The hotel reopened on 12 July 2017.

Heritage listings
Kadanga has a number of heritage-listed sites, including:

 Mary Valley Railway Cream Sheds
 Main Street: Kandanga Railway Station
 65 Main Street: Kandanga Cottage
 81 Main Street: Kandanga Memorial Hall
 84 – 86 Main Street: Kandanga State School
 41 – 45 Stephens Street: Sacred Heart Catholic Church

Education 
Kandanga State School is a government primary (Prep-6) school for boys and girls at 84 Main Street. In 2018, the school had an enrolment of 44 students with 4 teachers (3 full-time equivalent) and 6 non-teaching staff (3 full-time equivalent).

There are no secondary schools in Kandanga. The nearest government secondary schools are Mary Valley State College (to Year 10) in neighbouring Imbil to the south and Gympie State High School (to Year 12) in Gympie to the north.

References

Further reading

External links

University of Queensland: Queensland Places: Kandanga
Mary Valley Tourist site
Travelmate site

Towns in Queensland
Gympie Region
Localities in Queensland